

Jamaica

Head coach:  Wendell Downswell

References
http://rsssf.com/tablesc/caribe05det.html

Caribbean Cup squads